Attacus wardi is a moth from the family Saturniidae endemic to Northern Territory, Australia, historically classified as a subspecies of Attacus dohertyi.

Description
The wingspan of Attacus wardi is approximately 17 cm; fairly large for a moth, but still the smallest species in its genus. It is brown with two white bands and a large, white spot on each wing.

Distribution and habitat
Attacus wardi is known only from Darwin, Black Point Cobourg Peninsula and Melville Island. The species is restricted to coastal monsoon-rainforest.

References

Attacus wardi - lepidoptera.butterflyhouse.com.au

Saturniidae
Moths described in 1910
Moths of Australia